The Suffolk Guild of Ringers for the Diocese of St Edmundsbury and Ipswich is a society and charity supporting the bell ringers and rings of bells in the Diocese of St Edmundsbury and Ipswich who practice the art of change ringing. The Guild was established on 2 April 1923 at Ipswich and covers over 200 rings of bells in the county of Suffolk in the area that falls within the diocese boundary.

Origins
Prior to the creation of the Diocese of St Edmundsbury and Ipswich the western half of the county was part of the Diocese of Ely and the eastern half was part of the Diocese of Norwich and therefore ringers were members of the respective associations being the Ely Diocesan Association of Church Bell Ringers (EDACR) and the Norwich Diocesan Association of Ringers (NDAR).
After the diocese was created in 1914 Ely Diocesan Association adopted the name 'The Ely and St. Edmundsbury Diocesan Association' whilst the Norwich Diocesan Association was known as 'The Norwich and Ipswich Association.' The impetus for the formation of an Suffolk association came mainly from the west of the county but this met with much opposition particularly from (NDAR).
The Suffolk County Association, the first solely Suffolk based ringing organisation, was formed on 5 February 1921, at Lavenham, under the mastership of Stedman Symonds, but soon changed its name to the Suffolk Diocesan Association at Easter. On 29 April 1922, there was another change of name to the St. Edmundsbury and Ipswich Diocesan Association. Finally on 2 April 1923 the Suffolk Guild of Ringers was formed after a meeting at St. Mary le Tower Church House, Ipswich with Charles Sedgley being elected master and Rev. Herbert Drake as secretary.

Operations
As of the end of 2019 the Guild has 776 members from 198 towers with ringable bells. Its listed objects are to supporting the recruitment and training of bellringers and cultivating the art of scientific ringing alongside promoting and supporting the restoration and augmentation of rings of bells. 
The Guild is affiliated to the Central Council of Church Bell Ringers (CCCBR), a global organisation representing all those who practice Change ringing, and currently sends four representatives to be part of the Council.

Governance
A mixture of elected and appointed officers run the Guild with Guild Management Committee being the main decision making body. The chairman, secretary, treasurer, and ringing master make up the executive and are trustees of Guild which is registered as a charity. 
The Guild is split into four districts to encourage ringing at a local level through education and training. Each district covers a geographical quarter of the diocese, North East, South East, North West, and South West electing their own ringing master, secretary, treasurer along with representatives to the Guild's committees.

Ringing
Aside from regular religious services, ringing is often conducted for special occasions such as anniversaries, memorials and other locally or nationally significant events.
There are weekly evening practices held at around 80 towers across the Guild where all skills of change ringing are taught and practiced including method ringing. 
Each district in Guild has a rolling programme of monthly events at a different towers allowing ringers to socialise and practice more advance ringing, events will include outings outside of the Guild, striking contests, and socials.
The members of the Guild regularly ring peals, as defined by the Central Council of Church Bell Ringers. Between its formation and the end of 2019 there has been 9812 peals rung for the Guild. 
Quarter peals, which are performances of continuous method ringing last approximately 45 mins, are also regularly rung by members with around 530 being recorded in 2019.

Events

Striking contests
There are three annual striking competitions held by the Guild as well as a number held at district level. The three Guild contests are:
Rose trophy for eight bell method ringing
Mitson shield for six bell method ringing
Lester Brett trophy for six bell call change ringing
A combined band is sent represent the Guild as a whole at the East Anglian Ridgman trophy for ten bell method ringing.

Ipswich Christmas Ringing
Since 1993 Guild members have rung all the bells at the churches in Ipswich town centre on the Saturday before Christmas.

St Edmund's day
The Guild supported the campaign to restore Edmund the Martyr as patron saint of England by coordinating annual ringing of bells across Suffolk on his feast day of the 20 November due to his connection with Suffolk.

Ringing for Peace Armistice 100
On the 100th anniversary of the armistice November 2018 members of the Guild rang the bells at all the ringable towers in the diocese in a single day to mark the commemorations, a feat which had never been attempted before.

Affiliated towers
The towers covered by the Guild which contain four or more bells hung for change ringing.

North East District

North West District

South East District

South West District

External links
Guild website

References

Bell ringing societies in England
Diocese of St Edmundsbury and Ipswich
Organizations established in 1923
1923 establishments in England